"Break Out!" is a Japanese-language song by Tohoshinki. It was the group's 29th Japanese single, released in Japan on January 27, 2010 by Avex Group's sublabel Rhythm Zone. It was later included in their first Japanese compilation album, Best Selection 2010. It was used as the drama Tomehane! Suzuri Kōkō Shodōbus theme song. The single debuted on top of the Oricon daily chart with 169,842 copies sold. Altogether it sold 255,917 copies, topping the monthly chart as well, first time in the band's history. It also broke the previous record for a single of most copies sold in the first week of release held by Elton John.

Track listing

CD only version

CD
"Break Out!" (3:59)
"Xiahtic" (Junsu solo) (4:30)
"Break Out!" -New Jack Swing mix- (4:45)
"Break Out!" (Less Vocal) (3:58)
"Xiahtic" (Junsu solo) (Less Vocal) (4:28)

CD + DVD (first press edition version)

CD
"Break Out!" (3:59)
"Xiahtic" (Junsu solo) (4:30)
"Break Out!" (Less Vocal) (3:58)
"Xiahtic" (Junsu solo) (Less Vocal) (4:28)

DVD
"Break Out!" (PV)
"Break Out!" Offshoot movie

CD + DVD version

CD
"Break Out!" (3:59)
"Xiahtic" (Junsu solo) (4:30)
"Break Out!" (Less Vocal) (3:58)
"Xiahtic" (Junsu solo) (Less Vocal) (4:28)

DVD
"Break Out!" (PV)

References

2010 singles
Oricon Weekly number-one singles
TVXQ songs
Japanese television drama theme songs
Song recordings produced by Max Matsuura
2010 songs
Rhythm Zone singles
Song articles with missing songwriters